The 2013 Pan American Men's Junior Handball Championship took place in Mar del Plata from 18–24 March. It acts as the Pan American qualifying tournament for the 2013 Men's Junior World Handball Championship.

Teams

* Guatemala withdrew from this Pan American Junior Championship.

Preliminary round

Group A

Group B

Placement 7th–9th

7th/9th

7th/8th

Placement 5th–6th

Final round

Semifinals

Bronze-medal match

Gold-medal match

Final Standing

2013 in handball
Pan American Men's Junior Handball Championship
H
2013 in Argentine sport